The Miss Alabama's Teen competition is the pageant that selects the representative for the U.S. state of Alabama in the Miss America's Teen pageant.

Jessica Baeder of Auburn, Alabama was the first contestant from Alabama to win the national title on July 29, 2017.

Elaina Burt of Hoover was crowned Miss Alabama's Teen on March 12, 2023 at Thompson High School in Alabaster, Alabama. She will compete for the title of Miss America's Teen 2024.

In January of 2023, the official name of the pageant was changed from Miss Alabama’s Outstanding Teen, to Miss Alabama’s Teen, in accordance with the national pageant.

Results summary
The year in parentheses indicates the year of the Miss America's Teen competition the award/placement was garnered.

Placements
 Miss America's Outstanding Teens: Jessica Baeder (2018), Marcelle LeBlanc (2022)
 1st runners-up: Scarlett Walker (2011)
 2nd runners-up: Mi'a Callens (2012), Jessica Procter (2014), Morgan Green (2015)
 3rd runners-up: Collins McMurray (2019)
 Top 10: Jenna Bryant (2006), Abby Lynn Steverson (2007)
 Top 11: Tiara Pennington (2017)
 Top 15: Zoé Champion (2020)

Awards

Preliminary awards
 Preliminary Evening Wear/On Stage Question: Jessica Procter (2014), Morgan Green (2015), Zoé Champion (2020)
 Preliminary Lifestyle and Fitness: Jessica Procter (2014)
 Preliminary Talent: Scarlett Walker (2011), Mi'a Callens (2012), Jessica Baeder (2018), Marcelle LeBlanc (2022)

Non-finalist awards
 Non-finalist Talent: Haley Ates (2009)

Other awards
 Miss Congeniality/Spirit of America: Zoé Champion (2020)
 Outstanding Dance Award: Jessica Baeder (2018)
 Scholastic Excellence Award: Collins McMurray (2019)
 Teens in Action Award: Jessica Baeder (2018), Hailey Adams (2023)
Teens in Action Finalists: Marcelle LeBlanc (2022)
Top Interview Award: Marcelle LeBlanc (2022)

Winners

Notes

References

External links
 Miss Alabama's Outstanding Teen official website

Alabama
Alabama culture
Women in Alabama
Annual events in Alabama
Events in Birmingham, Alabama